"Can't Wait Until Tonight" was the  entry in the Eurovision Song Contest 2004, performed in English and Turkish by Maximilian Mutzke.

Thus, it was performed eighth on the night, following the ' Re-union with "Without You" and preceding 's Anjeza Shahini with "The Image of You". At the close of voting, it had received 93 points, placing 8th in a field of 24. Until the 2009 contest, it was the last top 10 finish for a "Big Four" country.

The song is a ballad, with Max singing about his desire for his lover and telling her that he "can't wait until tonight / for being with [her]". He goes on to tell her about how he felt the first time he saw her and how much he wants to prove his love.

The song was a jazz number, which UK commentator Terry Wogan likened to the music of the recent jazz phenomenon, Jamie Cullum (who would write an entry for Germany 8 years later).  Max appeared dressed casually in a black jumper and trousers.

The performance was relatively subdued, however Max performed one chorus in Turkish, which was greeted with considerable applause by the crowd – the contest being held that year in Istanbul. In an interview after the performance, writer Stefan Raab jokingly told Sertab Erener that he had written the song specifically for her. Max was accompanied by Raab (on the acoustic guitar) and some members of the Heavytones (the band from TV total) during his gig.

It was succeeded as German representative at the 2005 contest by Gracia with "Run & Hide".

Charts

Weekly charts

Year-end charts

References

External links
 Schild
 Official Eurovision Song Contest site, history by year
 Detailed info & lyrics, Diggiloo Thrush

Eurovision songs of Germany
Eurovision songs of 2004
English-language German songs
2004 songs
Songs written by Stefan Raab
Warner Music Group singles
2004 debut singles